John Charles Mallinger (born September 25, 1979) is an American professional golfer.

Mallinger was born in Escondido, California, and is the youngest of four children. He graduated from Escondido High School and earned his bachelor's degree in marketing from California State University, Long Beach. He resides in Long Beach, California, and plays out of Virginia Country Club, along with pros John Merrick and Peter Tomasulo.

Mallinger was a medalist at the 2005 Canadian Tour Qualifying School, but he earned the nickname “Monday Mally” by getting through several fall Monday Qualifying events and playing in enough Nationwide Tour events in 2005 to earn playing privileges for 2006 on the Nationwide Tour.  He breezed through all stages of the Qualifying School that year to earn his 2007 PGA Tour Card.  He earned over $1,600,000 on the PGA Tour in 2007, finishing runner-up to Brandt Snedeker for Rookie of the Year honors. He finished 91st on the 2008 money list, once again cracking the million dollar mark to retain his Tour card for 2009. Mallinger had another successful year in 2009, finishing in a tie for 3rd in the "Fifth Major" at The Players Championship and 2nd at the U.S. Bank Championship in Milwaukee where he lost a sudden death playoff to Bo Van Pelt. He finished in the top 50 of the money list for the first time.

Before playing on the PGA Tour, Mallinger won two events on the NGA Hooters Tour.

In 2011, Mallinger played in only 15 PGA Tour events due to his conditional status. He did not make the FedEx Cup and played on the Nationwide Tour during his time off the PGA Tour. He regained his PGA Tour card with a 14th-place finish on the Nationwide Tour money list, despite playing in only nine events, but earning six consecutive top-10 finishes.

Mallinger finished in a tie for 2nd place in his second start of the 2012 PGA Tour season at the Humana Challenge, two strokes behind Mark Wilson. This was the second time that Mallinger had been a runner up on the PGA Tour and remains his best finish to date.

Professional wins (1)

Other wins (1)

Playoff record
PGA Tour playoff record (0–1)

Results in major championships

CUT = missed the half-way cut
"T" = tied
Note: Mallinger never played in the Masters Tournament or The Open Championship.

Results in The Players Championship

CUT = missed the halfway cut
"T" indicates a tie for a place

See also
2006 PGA Tour Qualifying School graduates
2011 Nationwide Tour graduates

References

External links

American male golfers
Long Beach State Beach men's golfers
PGA Tour golfers
Korn Ferry Tour graduates
Golfers from California
Sportspeople from Escondido, California
Sportspeople from Long Beach, California
1979 births
Living people